Pandripani is a village  in Malkangiri district of Odisha state of India.

References

External links

Villages in Malkangiri district